Kibdelosporangium philippinense is a bacterium from the genus of Kibdelosporangium which has been isolated from soil on the Philippines.

References

Further reading 
 

Pseudonocardiales
Bacteria described in 1988